The men's individual nordic combined competition for the 1992 Winter Olympics in Albertville at Courchevel and Les Saisies on 11 and 12 February.

Results

Ski Jumping

Athletes did three normal hill ski jumps, with the lowest score dropped. The combined points earned on the jumps determined the starting order and times for the cross-country race; each three points was equal to a 20 second deficit.

Cross-Country

The cross-country race was over a distance of 15 kilometres.

References

Nordic combined at the 1992 Winter Olympics